The Ogdensburg and Lake Champlain Railroad was founded in 1849 as the Northern Railroad running from Ogdensburg to Rouses Point, New York. The  railroad was leased by rival Central Vermont Railroad for several decades, ending in 1896. It was purchased in 1901 by the Rutland Railroad and became its Ogdensburg Division.

History

Chartering and Construction 

The Northern Railroad was incorporated on May 14, 1845 for the purpose of connecting Ogdensburg on the St. Lawrence River to Rouses Point on Lake Champlain. An organizational meeting held in Ogdensburg in June, 1845 elected George Parish (later Baron von Senftenburg) as president, S. S. Walley as treasurer, James G. Hopkins as secretary, and Col. Charles L. Schiatter as chief engineer-superintendent. George Parish was allegedly upset that the route would not go through Parishville, named after his uncle David Parish, and resigned a few months that. He was replaced by Boston financier T.P. Chandler.

The railroad completed construction to Rouses Point on October 1, 1850. A connection was shortly after made to the Vermont and Canada Railroad in the State of Vermont when the railroads opened a floating bridge across Lake Champlain on September 1, 1851. This gave the Northern Railroad access to the markets in the growing New England cities. The shipment of agricultural products , especially butter, from New York farms to cities such as Boston was an sizeable part of the line's traffic. The company is alleged to have built and operated the first refrigerator car on an American railroad, starting operation in June, 1851 for shipping butter. Along with the rail line the company invested in docks and a grain elevator in Ogdensburg to serve steamship traffic.

Later History 

The Ogdensburg Division represented the Rutland Railroad's expansion across the top of New York state, to the St. Lawrence River and a connection with ships to Great Lakes ports. The colorful rural route remained "the outpost" throughout its existence. A final strike, staged by unionized crewmen, led to the last revenue train in the Fall of 1961. The dormant rails gathered rust until 1964, when the easternmost  from Rouses Point to Norwood Junction, NY were removed. The State of New York and Ogdensburg Port Authority assumed control of the remaining  to Ogdensburg's grain elevators, seaport, and coal furnace for a state hospital. Several shortline operators leased the line through the second half of the 1960s until the dawn of the 21st century. Vermont Rail System has operated the line for the past decade.

The remaining portion of the O&LC is seeing growing business, with many track improvements during the summers of 2012 and 2013. Two veteran EMD diesels are the usual power for the average two or three trains a week.

Meanwhile, the lengthy, trackless wooden trestle crossing Lake Champlain from Alburgh to Rouses Point suffered severe damage in 2011, reducing the once mile-long behemoth to little more than matchsticks. The right of way crosses the top of New York State, where trainless depots remain at Mooers Junction (lovingly restored by Larry Marnes and Chris Trombley), Mooers Forks (a thrift store), Ellenburgh Depot (animal rendering facility), Chateaugay (brick, but decaying quickly), Malone (twin brick turrets remain, overhead walkway gone since 1949, now an Elm Street bank), Brushton (storage), Moira (church) and Lisbon (museum).  Freighthouses remain at Winthrop and Champlain.

Route and Station listing

References

Further reading
 

Defunct New York (state) railroads
Predecessors of the Rutland Railroad
Railway companies established in 1864
Railway companies disestablished in 1898
American companies established in 1864